Miss America 1977, the 56th Miss America pageant, was held at the Boardwalk Hall in Atlantic City, New Jersey on September 11, 1976 on NBC Network.

Pageant winner Dorothy Benham became a singer, appearing often on the Crystal Cathedral religious-themed program Hour of Power.

Among the other contestants in 1977 was Miss Florida, actress Nancy Stafford, who would co-star with Andy Griffith 11 years later in the NBC TV series Matlock.

Results

Order of announcements

Top 10

Awards

Preliminary awards

Non-finalist awards

Judges
Gail Brown
Katherine C. Corbett
Frank DeFord†
Don Galloway†
Robert Lewine
Jeanne Meixell
Petr Spurney
Susan Starr

Contestants

External links
 Miss America official website

1977
1977 beauty pageants
1976 in New Jersey
September 1976 events in the United States
Events in Atlantic City, New Jersey